Radio in Estonia started on 21 October 1918, when special station for radio communications was established by Estonian Defence Ministry.

In February 1920 the radio apparatus was demonstrated on the first time.

The first radio test programme took place in Haapsalu. To centralize the radio activities, organization "Raadio-Ringhääling" was established on 1 November 1924. On 18 December 1926 the Kopli radio station set up in Tallinn; this denotes the starting of regular radio broadcasting.

In 1940, 90,000 radio apparatus were owned by Estonians.

Soviet era

Restoration of independence

In 2007, Estonian Radio and Estonian Television were merged, and Eesti Rahvusringhääling (Estonian Public Broadcasting, ERR) was established. ERR has five radio stations. There are around 35 private radio stations with programmes broadcast both in Estonian and in Russian, and radio is the primary source of information for 51% of Estonians.

List of radio stations

References